Gerard Kraus (February 25, 19201990) - was a Phillips Petroleum scientist known for developing testing standards for carbon black surface area.

Education 

Kraus was born in Prague, Czechoslovakia, the son of a pathologist and professor of medicine.  He came to the United States in 1940, following his graduation in 1938 from the State High School in Prague. In 1943, he completed his Bachelor of Science degree with High Honors from Southern Methodist University. He presented work entitled "Supercharging Diesels" at the ASME convention that year.  In 1947, he received the doctoral degree in polymer chemistry working under W. B. Reynolds at the University of Cincinnati, under a fellowship funded by the Inland Division of General Motors Corporation. He studied adhesion of rubber-to-metal interfaces with application to the manufacture of tank track treads.

Career 

From 1947 to 1953, Kraus was employed on the faculty at the University of Cincinnati, first as an instructor, then later as an assistant professor. He joined the Research and Development department at Phillips Petroleum Company in 1953. By 1963, he was managing a group responsible for exploratory work in carbon black, filler reinforcement, and properties of elastomers.  In 1968 his title was Senior Scientist. 

Kraus' most cited work is an account of the swelling behavior of filler-reinforced, vulcanized rubbers.  He established a relationship on the assumption that, at the filler interface, swelling is completely restricted due to adhesion.  He is also known for a model of the Payne effect.

Awards 

 1990 - Melvin Mooney Distinguished Technology Award 
 1996 - elected to the International Rubber Science Hall of Fame

References 

1920 births
1990 deaths
Polymer scientists and engineers
20th-century American engineers